The Prairie Mountain Health (PMH; ; formerly Western Regional Health Authority) is the governing body responsible for healthcare delivery and regulation for the eponymous health region in southwest Manitoba.

PMH is one of 5 regional health authorities (RHAs) in Manitoba, and was formed in June 2012 by amalgamating the former regional health authorities of Brandon, Assiniboine, and Parkland. As of July 2019, PMH has approximately 7,846 employees.

As of 2018, the population of the region was 170,899 (~12.9% of Manitoba's population). The region includes 20 acute care (hospital) sites, 43 long-term care (personal care home) sites, and 9 transitional care sites; as well as 6 primary healthcare centres, 1 primary care centre (Swan River), 1 orthopedic rehabilitation centre (Rivers), and 38 EMS ambulance facilities.

During the 2019/20 fiscal year, PMH was the largest user of Manitoba telehealth in the province.

Locations and communities 
The Region is made up of 55 municipalities, 14 First Nation communities, 15 Northern Affairs community councils, and 32 Hutterite communities. There are also 2 designated Francophone communities: St. Lazare in the Asessippi area and Ste. Rose in the Agassiz Mountain area, as well as a significant French-speaking community on and around the Canadian Forces Base Shilo.

Indigenous communities 
The geographical area of PMH includes 14 First Nation communities:

 Treaty 2 — Ebb and Flow, Keeseekoowenin, O-Chi-Chak-O-Sipi, and Skownan
 Treaty 4 — Gambler First Nation, Pine Creek, Rolling River, Sapotaweyak Cree Nation, Tootinaowaziibeeng, Waywayseecappo, and Wuskwi Sipihk
 Dakota First Nation (no Numbered Treaties) — Birdtail, Sioux Valley, and Canupawakpa

The Manitoba Métis Federation (MMF) is represented by 7 regions in Manitoba, with the MMF-Southwest and MMF-Northwest regions being within the boundaries of PMH, as well as a small pocket of several northern Métis Locals/communities.

Brandon Regional Health Centre 
The Brandon Regional Health Centre (BRHC) is the largest facility within the Prairie Mountain Health region and a central health-care hub for western Manitoba.

In 2016, the BRHC began a $16.8-million renovation project, with $15.8m funded by the Government of Manitoba and the remaining $1.1m coming from the PMH and a campaign by the BRHC Foundation. The project was officially completed in the 2019/20 fiscal year.

Former health authorities
Prairie Mountain Health was formed in June 2012 by amalgamating the former Brandon, Assiniboine, and Parkland Regional Health Authorities.

Assiniboine Regional Health Authority

The Assiniboine Regional Health Authority (ARHA) was the health-care service provider for the Assiniboine Region in southwestern Manitoba until it merged into Prairie Mountain Health in 2012. 

The population of the ARHA before the merge was estimated at 71,500.

ARHA provided health services in the following communities: Baldur, Birtle, Boissevain, Carberry, Rivers, Cartwright, Deloraine, Elkhorn, Erickson, Glenboro, Hamiota, Hartney, Killarney, Melita, Minnedosa, Neepawa, Reston, Russell, Sandy Lake, Shoal Lake, Souris, Strathclair, Treherne, Virden, and Wawanesa. It also included Riding Mountain National Park.

ARHA operated 20 acute care facilities, 1 transitional care unit, 28 long-term care facilities, and 7 elderly persons housing units. The ARHA provided public health, mental health, diagnostic, emergency medical, and home care services, with 64 physicians providing medical services in the area.

ARHA governance 
The BHRA was run by a 14-member board of directors. The Minister of Health appointed directors for a 3-year term. In August 2011, the ARHA directors were:

 Dean Dietrich (based in Neepawa) – Chairperson
 Debbie Eastcott (Shoal Lake)
 Randy Hodge (Killarney)
 Kristine Janz (Baldur)
 Jacqueline Leforte (Goodlands)
 Marg MacDonald (Brandon)
 Kelvin Nerbas (Shellmouth)
 Eva Whitebird (Rolling River First Nation)
 Leona Williams (Deloraine)
 Laura McDougald-Williams (Brandon)
 Reginald Buss
 Isobel Jarema (Neepawa)
 Terry Johnson (Virden)
 Pat Phillips

Brandon Regional Health Authority

The Brandon Regional Health Authority (BRHA) was the governing body for healthcare services in and around the City of Brandon, Manitoba.

In addition to Brandon, the BRHA service area included the Rural Municipalities of Cornwallis, Elton, and Whitehead, as well as being a regional referral centre for Manitoba's Westman area. Based on the 2001 Statistics Canada census, the BRHA served a population of 47,652.

In 2005, the BRHA was criticized for a lack of medical specialists and slow recruitment for departing physicians.

BHRA governance
As of September 2011, the BRHA board members were: 
Marg MacDonald – Chairperson
Alison McNeill-Hordern – Vice Chair
Rita Blaikie
Charles Cuerrier
Barry French – ARHA Rep.
Karen Doty-Sweetnam
Jo-Anne Douglas
D.J. Scotty McIntosh
Terry Parlow
Al Patterson
Perry Roque
Barbara Anne Smith
Anne Todd
Roland Vodon

Parkland Regional Health Authority 

The Parkland Regional Health Authority (PRHA) was the governing body responsible for the planning, coordination, funding, and delivery of all health services within the Parkland Region of west-central Manitoba. 

Serving a population of around 42,000, the PRHA had 7 hospitals, 11 personal care homes, and 6 Manitoba telehealth sites. 

The region covered the city of Dauphin; the town of Swan River; the Rural Municipalities of Alonsa (Alonsa, Bacon Ridge, Pine River) and Mountain (Birch River, Mafeking); and communities such as Benito, Camperville, Crane River, Duck Bay, Ethelbert, Gilbert Plains, Grandview, McCreary, Minitonas, Pelican Rapids, Roblin, Rorketon, Ste. Rose du Lac, Waterhen, and Winnipegosis.

PRHA governance 
The Parkland RHA’s Board of Directors would have up to 15 members including the Chairperson, with one vacancy and an option for one additional appointment by the Minister of Health. From April 2011 to March 31, 2012, PRHA's Board of Directors was:

 Mary Hudyma (based in Dauphin) – Chairperson
 Rowena Powell (Roblin) – Vice‐Chair
 Sharon Basaraba (Gilbert Plains)
 Monica Black (Bowsman)
 Patricia Delaurier (Ste. Rose)
 Alex Grimaldi (Dauphin)
 Robert Hanson (Mafeking)
 Anne Lacquette (Mallard)
 Andy Maxwell (Swan River)
 Charles "Chuck" Morden (McCreary)
 Paul Overgaard (Dauphin)
 Gerald Shewchuk (Dauphin)
 Harry Showdra (Swan River)
 John Tichon (Fork River)

YouTube video lawsuit
On April 12 2022, Prairie Mountain Health and ten of its employees filed a lawsuit in Winnipeg against a former employee, a psychiatric nurse who worked at the Brandon Regional Health Centre, based upon four videos she had uploaded to YouTube which Prairie Mountain Health alleged to be defamatory. The videos were said to contain disparaging statements about the employees as well the nurse's claims that she had been bullied in the workplace. Prairie Mountain Health sought an injunction forcing the nurse to remove the videos and prevent her from creating more of them.

See also
 Regional Health Authorities of Manitoba
 Interlake-Eastern Regional Health Authority
 Northern Regional Health Authority
 Southern Regional Health Authority
 Winnipeg Regional Health Authority

References

External links
 Prairie Mountain Health regional map
 Government of Manitoba - Regional Health Authorities
 Regional Health Authorities of Manitoba 

Health regions of Manitoba
Parkland Region, Manitoba